"Feva Las Vegas" is the third single by English hip hop trio, N-Dubz. The song was included on their debut album Uncle B. This song, along with "We Dance On", were the only singles not to be featured on the band's 2011 Greatest Hits album.

Track listing
 CD single
 "Feva Las Vegas"
 "N-Dubz vs. NAA"

 Digital Download
 "Feva Las Vegas" 
 "N-Dubz vs. NAA"
 "Feva Las Vegas" (Instrumental)
 "Feva Las Vegas" (A cappella version)

Charts

References

2006 songs
2007 singles
N-Dubz songs
Songs written by Tulisa (singer)
Songs written by Richard Rawson
Songs written by Dappy